Acarapis is a genus of mites belonging to the family Tarsonemidae.

The species of this genus are found in Europe and Northern America.

Species:
 Acarapis dorsalis Morgenthaler, 1934 
 Acarapis externus Morgenthaler, 1931 
 Acarapis vagans Schneider, 1941 
 Acarapis woodi (Rennie, 1921)

References

Trombidiformes
Trombidiformes genera